The following is a timeline of the presidency of Donald Trump during the third quarter of 2018, from July 1 to September 30, 2018. To navigate among quarters, see timeline of the Donald Trump presidency.

Overview

Public opinion

Timeline

July 2018

August 2018

September 2018

See also
Presidential transition of Donald Trump
First 100 days of Donald Trump's presidency
List of executive actions by Donald Trump
List of presidential trips made by Donald Trump (international trips)

References

2018 Q3
Presidency of Donald Trump
July 2018 events in the United States
August 2018 events in the United States
September 2018 events in the United States
2018 timelines
Political timelines of the 2010s by year
Articles containing video clips